Abacetus quadraticollis is a species of ground beetle in the subfamily Pterostichinae. It was described by J.Thomson in 1858.

References

quadraticollis
Beetles described in 1858